Birinci ferik or ferik-i evvel (corresponding to the earlier Ottoman rank of Serdar) was a military rank of the Ottoman Army. It is translated as Lieutenant General (modern Turkish Korgeneral). The title means "First Ferik" and was senior to a Ferik and junior only to the Müşir (equivalent to Field Marshal).

The collar mark (later shoulder mark) and cap of a Birinci Ferik had three stripes and three stars during the early years of the Turkish Republic. The Ottoman Army and pre-1934 Turkish Army had three general ranks (similar to the British ranking system), while the current Turkish Army has four general ranks (similar to the American ranking system), with the inclusion of General (Orgeneral) as the fourth introduced in 1934.

The title of Birinci Ferik was abolished with Act No. 2590 of 26 November 1934 on the Abolition of Titles and Appellations such as Efendi, Bey or Pasha.

Sources

See also 
Comparative military ranks of World War I

Military ranks of the Ottoman Empire
Turkish words and phrases